Dalibor Dvorský (born 15 June 2005) is a Slovak professional ice hockey centre currently playing with AIK of the HockeyAllsvenskan (Allsv). Dvorský is considered one of the top prospects in the 2023 NHL Entry Draft.

Playing career 
Playing as a youth within the Swedish and Slovakian junior leagues, Dvorský as a part of AIK, opted to join HC '05 Banská Bystrica of the Slovak Extraliga for the remainder of the 2020–21 on 6 January 2021, making his professional debut as a 15 year-old. Dvorský holds the record for youngest player to score a goal in the men's Slovak league. He finished with 2 goals and 4 points through 20 games with HC '05 Banská Bystrica.
 
Dvorský returned to AIK for the 2021–22 season and was later signed to his first senior team contract, agreeing to a two-year deal, on 7 February 2022.

International play
Dvorský won a gold medal with Team Slovakia at the 2022 World U18 Division IA Championships, scoring 11 points in only five games.

Career statistics

Regular season and playoffs

International

References

External links 
 

Dvorský, Dalibor
Dvorský, Dalibor
Sportspeople from Zvolen
Dvorský, Dalibor
Slovak expatriate ice hockey players in Sweden
AIK IF players
HC '05 Banská Bystrica players